Pornography has been dominated by a few pan-European producers and distributors, the most notable of which is the Private Media Group that successfully claimed the position previously held by Color Climax Corporation in the early 1990s. Most European countries also have local pornography producers, from Portugal (e.g. Naturalvideo) to Serbia (e.g. Hexor), who face varying levels of competition with international producers. The legal status of pornography varies widely in Europe; its production and distribution are illegal in countries such as Ukraine, Belarus and Bulgaria, while Hungary is noted for having liberal pornography laws.

Albania 

In Albania, pornography is illegal only for producing, delivery, advertising, import, selling and publication of pornographic materials in persons under 18 years old. Child pornography is strictly prohibited.

Austria 

In 1990, the "Federal Act Against Obscene Publications and for the Protection of Youth Morally Endangered" was passed to regulate pornography in Austria. In 1994 a prohibition on child pornography was added to the law. Under these regulations the minimum age for buying softcore pornography in Austria is 16 and the minimum age for buying hardcore pornography is 18. Publication of pornography or material depicting bestiality is illegal.

Azerbaijan 

In Azerbaijan in accordance with article 3 of the Media Act of 7 December 1999, "pornographic materials" are defined as works of art, photographic reproductions of paintings, information and other materials the main content of which is the crude and undignified depiction of the anatomical and physiological aspects of sexual relations. Pornography in Azerbaijan is easily and cheaply obtainable in Baku, although not in most other places. There are reports of bribes being charged for taking hardcore pornography across the country's borders. Meanwhile, the legal activity to combat child pornography is governed by 1998 Rights of the Child Act, 1999 Media Act, the Plan of Measures to Solve the Problem of Homeless and Street Children and the National Plan of Action to Combat Trafficking in Persons.

Belarus 

Pornography is illegal in Belarus. Production, distribution, promotion, exhibition as well as possession with intent of distribution or promotion of pornographic materials or objects of pornographic nature is punished by Belarusian criminal law and results in compulsory community service, fine or up to 4 years imprisonment.

Belgium

Bulgaria 

In the People's Republic of Bulgaria (1946–1990) pornography was only available to a comparatively limited number of people. What pornographic materials there were (mostly magazines and videocassettes) were smuggled into the country. The abandonment of censorship in the early post-communist period resulted in pornography becoming widely available. In the early 1990s pornographic magazines were sold at newsstands, pirated foreign pornographic videocassettes became available and foreign pornographic television stations were accessible. The first Bulgarian pornographic film was made in 1992.

The production and distribution of pornography is illegal in Bulgaria. The filming of pornography and the online distribution of sexual content are illegal. There are no Bulgarian pornographic production companies. Accessing, possessing or storing pornographic materials is not illegal (except for child pornography).

Authorities tolerate illegal distribution of hardcore porn in designated shops, and on TV after 11 pm. Softcore material is rarely censored. Magazines and pornographic papers have become increasingly available since the fall of communism in 1989, and local editions of many international porn magazines are published. Society is often exposed to sexual content in advertising.

Croatia

Cyprus

Czech Republic 

Pornography in the Czech Republic was legalized in 1993 following the Velvet Revolution, when the country ceased to be a communist state and returned to liberal democracy. Among the Czech companies that produce pornography are LegalPorno Studios, based in Prague.

The sale and distribution of child pornography is illegal and is punishable by imprisonment for up to 3 years. Possession of child pornography was made illegal in 2007 and carries a penalty of up to 2 years in prison. The Czech penal code also bans the sale and distribution of pornography depicting sexual intercourse with an animal and pornography depicting violence or disrespect to human beings, with a penalty of up to 1 year in prison.

Denmark 

A ban on pornographic literature was lifted in 1967. In 1969, Denmark became the first country in the world to legalize pornography. People in Denmark have free access to pornography. Pornography including minors younger than 18 years is prohibited, and possession of the same is also illegal.

Estonia 

Pornography is legal, distribution or production is regulated by law.

Finland 

In Finland, child pornography is illegal, along with violent and bestial pornography. It is legal to sell pornography in any store, but magazines may not be sold to buyers less than 15 years of age, and hardcore is restricted to buyers aged at least 18.

Prior to 1 January 1999, all indecent publishing, including the import and export thereof, was banned.

France

Germany

Pornography is legal with the exception of child pornography. Like in many other countries, child pornography in Germany is illegal. German prosecution authorities and legal bodies of Germany's sixteen states handle the definition of child pornography very differently. The German Edathy affair of 2013/14 following the neglected cooperation of BKA within the Canadian child pornography uncoverings gave way for new legislation procedures in parliament to define the status of either posing or exhibitive pictures of minors. New laws were still in parliamentary debating as lately as 19 December 2014.

Greece 
Pornography in Greece is legal by selling or publishing material, but it is illegal to minors under 18 years old. Despite the fact, the practice is still commonly done because the law is weakly enforced. Pornographic material is sold in sex shops, DVD-clubs, mini markets, and kiosk shops. There is also a local pornographic production which began unofficially in the 1970s, which then became official and full legal since 2008. Child pornography is illegal and is punished by imprisonment and money penalties.

Hungary

In Hungary, the production of pornography mainly dates from the period after the fall of communism in 1989. The production and distribution of pornography was illegal under communism, but the laws were liberalised with the emergence of democracy. Permissive government policies soon propelled the country to the forefront of the European pornography industry. Several foreign directors were attracted to the country's liberal legislation, cheap production costs and large supply of attractive female performers. Eventually, domestic producers began to prosper as well, and several female actresses made big names for themselves within the industry. Hungarian pornography is different from that produced in America in the more natural appearance of its performers. The sex scenes also tend to be more extreme, with frequent use of anal sex and various forms of multiple penetration.

Iceland 
Publication of pornography is illegal in Iceland, and is punishable by a fine or imprisonment for up to 6 months. Publication of child pornography is punishable by a fine or imprisonment for up to 2 years. In 2013 the Icelandic government proposed banning violent Internet pornography and Iceland's parliament began debating a ban on online pornography.

Ireland 
Other than regulations regarding pornographic movies, no laws against pornography, other than child pornography (a child is defined as someone under 18), exist.

Italy

Although Italy had accumulated a lot of softcore pornography in the 1970s, hardcore pornography was not a usual trend until the 1980s. The first pornographic film in Italy was Il Telefono rosso (The red telephone) in 1983 by Riccardo Schicchi with Ilona Staller (aka "Cicciolina"). The film caused much controversy and it was restrained from legal release until 1986 with an alternate revision of Italian censorship laws.

Latvia 
In Latvia, the distribution of pornographic material is allowed under very similar legal conditions as in Poland. Pornographic or erotic material is rarely to never sold in places accessible to general public.

Lithuania 
In Lithuania, commercial distribution of pornographic material is prohibited by the Article 309 of the country's Criminal Code which states that "A person who, for the purpose of distribution, produces or acquires pornographic material or distributes such material shall be punished by community service or by a fine or by restriction of liberty or by imprisonment for a term of up to one year".

Malta 

In Malta, pornography and obscene material was outlawed until later 2016, regardless of whether it has a commercial interest or whether it is directed to an adult audience. The relevant law in this respect was Article 208 (1) of the Criminal Code of Malta which prohibited the manufacture, print, importation, circulation and exportation of pornographic or obscene print, painting, photograph, film, book, card or writing, or any other obscene article whatsoever, whether for gain, or for distribution, or for display in a public place. In a decision given on 21 February 2011, the Maltese Court of Criminal Appeal upheld the criminal conviction of Mr. Alexander Baldacchino who was found guilty of exhibiting soft and hardcore pornographic films at the City Lights Theatre in Valletta. In another judgement, student editor Mark Camilleri and author Alex Vella Gera were found not guilty under Article 208 (1) of the Criminal Code and Article 7 of the Press Act (obscene libel) for the publication of an obscene story entitled Li Tkisser Sewwi (translated in English to 'Repair that which you break') in student newspaper Realtà (distributed for free on campus at the University of Malta) by the Court of Magistrates (Malta). The decision was upheld by the Court of Criminal Appeal.

In 2015, the Minister of Social Justice Owen Bonnici started to work on legislation to allow both services or art to create pornographic material while also giving official right to access pornographic material. By late 2016 the parliament of Malta gave the green light for most pornographic material. Pornography involving minors, disabled and extreme forms of expression, including threats with the use of such material, remain illegal.

Netherlands 

 Article 240a indirectly prohibits giving pornographic pictures to children younger than 16 years. Maximum imprisonment is one year, or a fine of the 4th category (€19,500).
 Article 240b prohibits child pornography, which is defined as a picture showing a person younger than 18 performing sexual acts. Maximum imprisonment is 4 years or a fine of the 5th category (€78,000). It also prohibits making a profession or habit of it. The maximum imprisonment in that case is 6 years or a fine of the 5th category (€78,000).
 Article 248e prohibits online dating with minors (0–15 years old) in order to have sex or to make porn with them. The maximum imprisonment in that case is 2 years or a fine of the 4th category (€19,500).
 Article 254a prohibits bestiality porn. Maximum imprisonment is 6 months or a fine of the 3rd category (€7,800).

Norway 
In Norway, hardcore material was illegal until 2006 de jure to distribute, or sell, but legal to possess. Production, however, was not explicitly illegal, thus both photo and movie shoots occurred. One could acquire pornography abroad, on the Internet, or via satellite TV. Illegal porn shops also existed, especially in larger cities. To satisfy legal requirements, editors of erotic magazines, domestic TV channels, and cable TV obscured sexual organs in activity using black rectangles and the like. After the Supreme Court of Norway unanimously acquitted a former magazine editor on 7 December 2005 for publishing unobscured hardcore pornography in 2002, it became understood that printed hardcore pornography was no longer illegal. Pornography became legal on March 14, 2006. Regular and cable TV tend to abide by the old standards, seeing that edited TV is regulated by a separate law and thus is not affected by the Supreme Court decision. Video-on-demand, however, is not regulated by the TV laws, and, thus, pornography is legal to order.

The depiction of illegal sexual activities, including those involving children, animals, necrophilia, rape, violence, or the use of force, remains illegal.

Poland 
In Poland, as of September 1998, Article 202 of the national Penal Code makes pornography legal except for the production or possession of pornographic materials containing minors, bestiality (zoophilia), and "scenes of violence/rape". Also illegal is presenting or showing pornographic materials to people who do not want to have any contact with them, and to persons under 15 years of age.

Portugal 
In Portugal, hardcore pornographic movies can only be shown in adult cinemas. Videos and magazines are openly sold in newsstands but are forbidden by law to be supplied to minors under the age of 18 years. Additionally, hardcore pornographic movies are banned from open-channel TV and can only be broadcast through encrypted/pay-per-view channels.

Child pornography (i.e., pornography depicting children or juveniles below the age of 18) is illegal. Although the national age of consent is 14, the age of legal responsibility (i.e., the age a person can sign contracts consenting to appear in pornography) is 18.

Romania

Russia
Most Russian pornography is produced in Moscow and in St. Petersburg where the largest adult film producer, SP-Company, is based. The types of Russian adult films may range from gonzo pornography to adaptations of Russian classics (Eugene Onegin (by Tatiana Taneyeva (2003)), The Master and Margarita (by Armen Oganezov & Sergei Pryanishnikov (2002)) etc.) and these productions basically aim the domestic market. Much of the pornography is produced for the international internet market.

According to Russian law, consumption of pornography is allowed though the production of it is not. The illegal production, distribution, and "public demonstration" of pornography is punishable by a 2- to 6-year prison term. Roskomnadzor, the Russian government's media overseer, has the power to order the blocking of pornographic websites. In 2015 the agency required the blocking of the Russian-language version of Pornhub and 10 other pornographic sites on the basis of a court ruling.

Spain 
Pornography was illegal in Francoist Spain, although some people travelled to France to see films such as Last Tango in Paris and some group tours to French X-rated cinemas were organised. For climate reasons, a number of Private movies were shot though not released in Spain.

The censorship of that period ended with Franco's death in 1975. For less than a year there was no censorship at all, and hardcore porn was sometimes shown in main cinemas. Subsequently the S-rating for films was introduced, allowing softcore pornography to be shown in mainstream cinemas. The film genre that arose was known as destape (undressing) and included popular films such as Las eróticas vacaciones de Stela (Stela's Erotic Vacations), El mundo maravilloso del sexo (The Marvellous World of Sex), Trampa sexual (Sexual Trap) and La orgía (The Orgy). The magazine Interviú, founded in 1976, had revealing covers of famous actresses and included nude photographs inside. In 1983 the S-rating was replaced by the more permissive X-rating.

Sweden 
Like Denmark and the Netherlands, Sweden does not regulate pornography and the country has no age laws for the possession or viewing of pornography. Some shops follow a voluntary limit and do not sell to minors. Material that involves animals is legal, though it is subject to animal-welfare laws. BDSM is classified as an "illegal depiction of violence" (olaga våldsskildring).

It is illegal for people under the age of 18 to act or pose for pornography in Sweden. Recording, downloading, distributing or watching pornographic photographs and films depicting children is a crime. Swedish child pornography laws outlaw actual photographic material as well as drawn images. The Supreme Court argued, however, that because a conviction would mean a restraint in the defendant’s freedom of expression, the court must present a serious case as to when pornographic manga-styled cartoon images like hentai or lolicon can have any potential to harm a child in any way. Since the images are usually not made in any child’s likeness and because e.g. manga was deemed an expression of Japanese culture, the Supreme Court ruled that the restraint on the defendant’s freedom of expression would be too great if it was punishable due to the images being held to constitute child pornography.

Switzerland 
Pornography in Switzerland is defined by the Article 197 of the Swiss criminal code. The first alinea states that «Any person who offers, shows, passes on or makes accessible to a person who is under the age of 16 pornographic documents, sound or visual recordings, depictions or other articles of a similar nature or pornographic representations, or broadcasts any of the same on radio or television is liable to a custodial sentence not exceeding three years or to a monetary penalty.» Furthermore, it is illegal to produce, import, store, market, advertise, exhibit, offer, show, pass on or make accessible pornography that depicts sexual acts involving children (under 16 years old) or animals, human excrement, or acts of violence, called "hard pornography".

Since July 2014, human excrement and urine are not considered being "hard pornography" anymore. Until June 2014, actors aged 16 and above could participate in a pornography production; however, since July 2014, if a person "looks" or is under 18 years of age, the material is considered as pedo-pornography. This is due to the Swiss ratification of the Lanzarote Convention.

The age of viewing pornography stays fixed at 16 years old (Art. 197 al. 1 of the Swiss criminal code).

The same materials cited above are nevertheless not regarded as pornographic if they have a cultural or scientific value that justifies their protection by law.

Turkey 

Turkey, which is a formally secular state with a Muslim majority, was the first country to legally produce pornographic materials in the Muslim world. After a long period of producing Italian-inspired softcore comedies in the 1970s, the hardcore film Öyle Bir Kadın Ki was distributed in 1979.

Ukraine 
Pornography was outlawed in Ukraine in 2009 when the then president Victor Yushchenko signed new legislation. The law has been overwhelmingly approved by the Verkhovna Rada (the Ukrainian parliament). The possession, distribution, sale and manufacture of pornographic materials are illegal, with laws strictly enforced. Possession of pornographic material can carry a fine or up to three years imprisonment. Pornography is defined by the law as "vulgar, candid, cynical, obscene depiction of sexual acts, pursuing no other goal, the explicit demonstration of genitals, unethical elements of the sexual act, sexual perversions, realistic sketches that do not meet moral criteria and offend honor and dignity of the human by inciting low instincts". Pornography for "medical purposes" remains legal.

Wiska, one of Ukraine's internationally known pornstars, alleges continuous and unconstitutional persecution for her work abroad, and has unsuccessfully applied for political asylum in the European Union.

United Kingdom

"In Britain, where pornography is already more restricted than it is anywhere else in the English-speaking world or in Western Europe", wrote Avedon Carol in 1995, "sexual media is easily smeared for an audience that is seldom given an opportunity to see what really is sold under the name of 'pornography'". However the current British legislative framework including the Obscene Publications Act 1959 (in England and Wales), the Civic Government (Scotland) Act 1982 and the Video Recordings Act 1984 leads to a confusing situation in which there is a theoretical ban on the publication, distribution, and possession of pornographic material in any form including nudity and arguably bathing costumes, which is in practice unenforcable due to the vagueness of the legal test of material that "depraves and corrupts". In practice, hardcore material on video and DVD was until recently banned by the requirement under the Video Recordings Act to be certified by the BBFC, while mainstream hardcore material in other forms such as magazines and websites is essentially unrestricted. Continental European, American and British hardcore pornographic magazines are now openly sold in many British newsagents, for instance. Due to liberalisation in BBFC policy, mainstream hardcore DVDs now receive R18 certificates, legalising them but restricting their sale to licensed sex shops such as those in Soho.

British-made pornography tends to focus on a rough-and-ready semi-amateur look rather than the more stylized glamorous look of Continental European pornography.

Until it left the European Union on 1 January 2021, the UK was the only Member State of the EU to prohibit private imports of adult pornography by consumers coming from other Member States. In the 2004–2005 fiscal year, the agents of Her Majesty's Revenue and Customs seized 96,783 items of pornographic media carried by people travelling into the UK.

In 2005, the UK porn industry was estimated to be worth about £1 billion.

See also

 Adult Film Database
 Pornography in the Americas
 Pornography in Asia
 Pornography laws by region

References

Works cited

Further reading 
 

 
 
European culture